José Salvador Miranda (born 22 August 1971 in Mexico City) is a Mexican former middle distance runner who competed in the 2000 Summer Olympics. His personal best in the 3000 metres steeplechase is 8:25.69 achieved in 2000. Until 2020, he maintains the Steeplechase record in Mexico and Central America.
He now coaches the distance and middle distance runners from the athletics team of the Mexican college Instituto Tecnológico y de Estudios Superiores de Monterrey, Campus Ciudad de México in Mexico City.

Among his most important achievements, he has been granted with several recognitions from the UNAM, the Federación Mexicana de Asociaciones de Atletismo and the IAAF.

Competition record

References
 

1971 births
Living people
Athletes from Mexico City
Mexican male middle-distance runners
Mexican male steeplechase runners
Olympic athletes of Mexico
Athletes (track and field) at the 2000 Summer Olympics
World Athletics Championships athletes for Mexico
Athletes (track and field) at the 1995 Pan American Games
Athletes (track and field) at the 2003 Pan American Games
Pan American Games medalists in athletics (track and field)
Pan American Games bronze medalists for Mexico
Central American and Caribbean Games gold medalists for Mexico
Competitors at the 1998 Central American and Caribbean Games
Competitors at the 2002 Central American and Caribbean Games
Competitors at the 2006 Central American and Caribbean Games
Central American and Caribbean Games medalists in athletics
Medalists at the 1995 Pan American Games
20th-century Mexican people